The Norge Storage Site is a historic building in the small native city of Teller, Alaska. It is a two-story wood frame building with a false front, and a small single-story addition to the east. The building's notability lies with its association with the groundbreaking voyage of the dirigible Norge, which overflew the North Pole on May 11, 1926. Commanded by the explorer Roald Amundsen and its Italian maker, Umberto Nobile, the airship flew from Spitsbergen, Norway on May 10, and made for Nome after crossing the pole. The airship was dismantled and stored here until a freighter could be sent to recover it.

The building was listed on the National Register of Historic Places in 1974.

See also
National Register of Historic Places listings in Nome Census Area, Alaska

References

Commercial buildings on the National Register of Historic Places in Alaska
Buildings and structures in Nome Census Area, Alaska
Exploration of the Arctic
Buildings and structures on the National Register of Historic Places in Nome Census Area, Alaska